The following is a partial list of the "A" codes for Medical Subject Headings (MeSH), as defined by the United States National Library of Medicine (NLM).

This list continues the information at List of MeSH codes (A03). Codes following these are found at List of MeSH codes (A05). For other MeSH codes, see List of MeSH codes.

The source for this content is the set of 2006 MeSH Trees from the NLM.

– respiratory system

– larynx
  – glottis
  – vocal cords
  – laryngeal cartilages
  – arytenoid cartilage
  – cricoid cartilage
  – epiglottis
  – thyroid cartilage
  – laryngeal mucosa
  – goblet cells
  – laryngeal muscles

– lung
  – bronchi
  – extravascular lung water
  – pulmonary alveoli
  – blood-air barrier

– nose
  – nasal bone
  – nasal cavity
  – nasal mucosa
  – goblet cells
  – olfactory mucosa
  – olfactory receptor neurons
  – nasal septum
  – vomeronasal organ
  – paranasal sinuses
  – ethmoid sinus
  – frontal sinus
  – maxillary sinus
  – sphenoid sinus
  – turbinates

– pharynx
  – hypopharynx
  – nasopharynx
  – oropharynx
  – tonsil
  – pharyngeal muscles
  – esophageal sphincter, upper

– pleura

– respiratory mucosa
  – goblet cells
  – laryngeal mucosa
  – nasal mucosa
  – olfactory mucosa
  – olfactory receptor neurons

– trachea

The list continues at List of MeSH codes (A05).

A04